Sir Daniel Macnee FRSE PRSA LLD (4 June 1806, Fintry, Stirlingshire – 17 January 1882, Edinburgh), was a Scottish portrait painter who served as president of the Royal Scottish Academy (1876).

Life

He was born at Fintry in Stirlingshire. At the age of thirteen he was apprenticed, alongside Horatio McCulloch and Leitch the water colourist, to the landscape artist John Knox. He afterwards worked for a year as a lithographer, and was employed by a company in Cumnock, Ayrshire (Smiths of Cumnock), to paint the ornamental lids of their sycamore-wood snuff-boxes.

He studied in Edinburgh at the Trustees' Academy, where he supported himself by illustrating publications for William Home Lizars the engraver. Moving to Glasgow, he established himself as a fashionable portrait painter. In 1829 he was admitted as a member of the Royal Scottish Academy. He does not appear as an independent property owner until 1840 when he is listed as a portrait painter living at 126 West Regent Street in Glasgow.

On the death of Sir George Harvey in 1876 he was elected President of the Royal Scottish Academy. From then until his death he remained in Edinburgh, where, according to the 1911 Encyclopædia Britannica, "his genial social qualities and his inimitable powers as a teller of humorous Scottish anecdotes rendered him popular". He lived at 6 Learmonth Terrace in Edinburgh's fashionable West End.

He was knighted by Queen Victoria in 1877. In the same year he was elected a Fellow of the Royal Society of Edinburgh. His proposers were Thomas Brumby Johnston, John Hutton Balfour, Sir Andrew Douglas Maclagan and Sir Charles Wyville Thomson.

Several of Macnee's works are held by the National Portrait Gallery in London and at the National Gallery of Scotland in Edinburgh.

Macnee is buried in Dean Cemetery in western Edinburgh with his wife Mary Buchanan, and children, Constance and Thomas Wiseman Macnee. They lie against the north wall of the northern extension.

Family

He was first married to Margaret (1810–1847) by whom he had at least seven children, including Horace Macnee CE. She is buried in Glasgow Necropolis.

He was married (c.1850), secondly, to Mary Buchanan Macnee (1834–1931), 28 years his junior.

His daughter Isabella Wiseman was the subject of his masterpiece "Lady in Grey" (1859), which is held in the National Gallery of Scotland.

His great-grandson was the actor Patrick Macnee.

Notable portraits
James Fillans, sculptor
Horatio McCulloch, artist and friend
Mrs George Kerr
Mrs Catherine Blackie
Alexander Morrison of Ballinakill
Mrs Samuel Bough
John Boyd Baxter
John Ramsay McCulloch
Thomas Duncan, artist and friend
John Dykes, Provost
Sir William Jackson MP
Rev James Begg
Peter Coats, thread magnate
David Crawford
Charles Randolph, shipbuilder
James Stuart of Dunearn
Robert Dalglish MP
Dugald Moore
Lady Macnee (his wife) with his children
Arthur Perigal, artist and friend
John Elder, shipbuilder
Peter Denny
Rev Robert Barclay
David Hutcheson
John Wilson, singer

References

External links

Memoirs and portraits of one hundred Glasgow men

1806 births
1882 deaths
People from Stirling (council area)
Royal Scottish Academicians
Burials at the Dean Cemetery
19th-century Scottish painters
Scottish male painters
Fellows of the Royal Society of Edinburgh
Scottish knights
19th-century British artists
Scottish portrait painters
Alumni of the Edinburgh College of Art
19th-century male artists